J. M. A. Hannan (born 1967) is the founder chairman and professor of the Department of Pharmaceutical Sciences, North South University, Dhaka, Bangladesh and the Department of Pharmacy, Independent University, Bangladesh. He is currently the dean of the School of Pharmacy and Public Health at Independent University Bangladesh. He has over 17 years of teaching and research experience.  He has published a textbook on pharmaceutical statistics the only of its kind published by a Bangladeshi author. He has earned a PhD in pharmacology from University of Ulster, UK and a Master's in pharmacy, Jahangirnagar University.

Teaching and research experience
Independent University, Bangladesh, Dean, School of Pharmacy and Public Health 2020–present 
Independent University, Bangladesh, Head, Department of Pharmacy 2018-2020 
 East West University, Dept of Pharmacy, Professor, 2016 to 2017
 North South University, Dhaka, Bangladesh - Head, Dept of Pharmacy (January 2006 – 2013)
 East West University, Dhaka, Bangladesh - Assistant Professor, Department of Pharmacy (2005–2006)
 Jahangirnagar University, Savar, Dhaka, Bangladesh - Part-time faculty, Department of Pharmacy (2005–2006)
 BIRDEM, Dhaka, Bangladesh - Senior Research Officer (Equivalent to assistant professor) and Research Officer, Department of Pharmacology, (1997–2005)
 Research Fellow of International Program in the Chemical Sciences (IPICS), Sweden in the same Department (1993–1997), Northern University, Dhanmondi, Dhaka, Bangladesh - Part-time faculty, MPH Program (2005–2006)
 University of Paris, France - Visiting scientist in the Laboratory de Physiopathologie de la Nutrition, University of Paris, CNRS URA 0307, Paris 7, 2 Place Jussieu, 75251 Paris Cedex 05, France under a Fellowship Program of International Program in the Chemical Sciences (IPICS) (February 1999 to October 1999).
 University of Ulster, UK - Research student in the Diabetes Research Laboratory, Biomedical Sciences, University of Ulster, UK under a Fellowship Program of International Program in the Chemical Sciences (IPICS) (2001–2003)

Publications
 JMA Hannan. Medical & Pharmaceutical Statistics. Sangbed Publishers, Dhaka. 2007. pp 328.

Hannan has produced many other publications.

Current research activities
Hannan's research activities include:
 Effect of plant fractions on insulin secretion in perfused rat pancreas and isolated islets.
 Effect of antidiabetic plant materials on carbohydrate digestion and absorption in the gut of rats.
 Studies on fish oils for the management of insulin resistance, dyslipidemia and platelet aggregation associated with type 2 diabetes.
 Biochemical feature of Bangladeshi Young Diabetic subjects.
 Glycemic status of foods specially made for diabetic patients.

References

Bangladeshi pharmacologists
Living people
Jahangirnagar University alumni
1967 births